The Dogs were a 1990s hip hop group consisting of Disco Rick, Keith Bell, Labrant Dennis, and Fergus "Cracked Up" Smith, best known for "Crack Rock," their hit single with the chant "Yo' Mama's on Crack Rock!"  The group released three studio albums The Dogs in 1990, Beware of The Dogs in 1991 and K-9 Bass in 1992.

The group officially disbanded in 1996 when Labrant Dennis was arrested for the murder of his ex-girlfriend, Timwanika Lumpkins, and her lover Marlin Barnes, a linebacker for the University of Miami football team. Dennis was convicted of the double-murders in 1998, and sentenced to death in 1999. Dennis remains on death row.

Discography

References

Birchmeier, Jason "[ The Dogs Biography]", Allmusic, Macrovision Corporation

American hip hop groups
Southern hip hop groups
Musical groups from Miami